Uzo or Uzō may refer to:

People
 Uzo Asonye, American attorney
 Uzō Nishiyama (1911–1994), Japanese architect
 Uzo Egonu (1931–1996), Nigerian artist
 Uzo (filmmaker) (born 1957), Nigerian filmmaker
 Uzo Iwobi (born 1969), British-Nigerian solicitor
 Uzo Aduba (born 1981), Nigerian-American actress
 Uchenna Uzo (born 1992), Nigerian footballer
 Tobenna Uzo (born 1994), Nigerian footballer

Other
 Isi Uzo, a local government area in Nigeria
 Uzo Uwani, a local government area in Nigeria

See also
 Uzos, a commune in south west France
 Ouzo, an anise-flavoured aperitif widely consumed in Greece and Cyprus
 Itu Mbon Uzo language, a dialect of the Ibuoro language